The Asian Tour 2013/2014 – Event 3 (also known as the 2013 Zhengzhou Open) was a professional minor-ranking snooker tournament that took place between 20 and 24 October 2013 at the Guanhua Grand Hotel in Zhengzhou, China.

Liang Wenbo won his first title carrying ranking points by defeating Lyu Haotian 4–0 in the final.

Prize fund and ranking points 
The breakdown of prize money and ranking points of the event is shown below:

1 Only professional players can earn ranking points.

Main draw

Top half

Section 1

Section 2

Section 3

Section 4

Bottom half

Section 5

Section 6

Section 7

Section 8

Finals

Century breaks 

 136, 123, 121, 117  Gary Wilson
 131  Luo Honghao
 129  Zhang Anda
 128, 113  Stuart Bingham
 126  Tian Pengfei
 124, 106  John Higgins
 120  Zhou Yuelong
 113  Anthony McGill

 109  Xiao Guodong
 106  Li Yujin
 104  Liang Wenbo
 103  Mark Selby
 100  Lyu Haotian
 100  Mei Xiwen
 100  Qiu Yalong

References 

AT3
2013 in Chinese sport
Snooker competitions in China